Barogharia is in Dhupguri area of Jalpaiguri district, West Bengal, India. Barogharia is also called Barogharia Gram Panchayat and Barogharia Anchal.
Pratap Mazumder from Dakshin Khairbari is present Prodhan from the year 2015.

Cities and towns in Jalpaiguri district